The Flight That Fought Back is a docudrama film produced by the London-based company Brook Lapping Productions for the Discovery Channel, about United Airlines Flight 93. The program debuted in the United States on September 11, 2005, marking the fourth anniversary of the event on which it is based.

Crew
Original music was provided for the film by London-based post-rock musician Mark Beazley, more frequently known as Rothko, and composer Gavin Skinner. The film was directed by Bruce Goodison and edited by London-based documentary filmmaker Joby Gee.  It starred Greg Benson as passenger Todd Burnett, Jason LeGrande as passenger Mark Bingham, and Pej Vahdat as terrorist Ziad Jarrah.

Charity
Discovery is donating all proceeds from sales from the DVD to the construction of the permanent Flight 93 National Memorial.

Reception
The film received an Emmy nomination for Outstanding Made-for-Television Movie.

International release
The film aired on Five in the United Kingdom on January 5, 2006; on Channel One in Russia on September 8, 2007; on the Japanese Discovery Channel as well as the German television channel Kabel1 on September 11, 2007; and on Irish channel RTÉ2 on September 11, 2010.

See also
Flight 93 (disambiguation)

References

External links
 Official website on Discovery.com
 
 

2005 television films
2005 films
American television films
British television films
Films based on the September 11 attacks
Discovery Channel original programming
United Airlines Flight 93
American aviation films
British aviation films
2000s English-language films
2000s American films
2000s British films